Narzal García (born 13 July 1946) is a Filipino judoka. He competed in the men's middleweight event at the 1964 Summer Olympics.

References

1946 births
Living people
Filipino male judoka
Olympic judoka of the Philippines
Judoka at the 1964 Summer Olympics
Place of birth missing (living people)